Obi-Wan Kenobi Street (Polish: ulica Obi-Wana Kenobiego) is a street in the town of Grabowiec in Toruń County, Kuyavian-Pomeranian Voivodeship, Poland. The street is named after Obi-Wan Kenobi, a fictional character in the Star Wars franchise.

History 

The street name was proposed by Leszek Budkiewicz, a member of the community council of Gmina Lubicz within which is located in Grabowiec. The proposition was accepted in resolution XXVIII/373/04 of 30 December 2004, and came into force 14 days later.

Since then, the street name had attracted numerous Star Wars fans. In 2009, during Star Force, a Star Wars fans convention, many participants visited the street while wearing various Star Wars-themed cosplays.

The street was visited by the Star Wars actors Gerald Home and Paul Blake in 2008.

The street inspired propositions of naming streets in other cities of Poland after Obi-Wan Kenobi, including in: Bielsko-Biała and Kraków.

In 2021, the street was rebuilt, with its surface being updated from dirt to concrete cube. The investment cost 580 thousand Polish złoty, of which 290 thousand was covered by the Local Government Roads Fund.

References 

Streets in Poland
Toruń County
Star Wars fandom